Ella Gibson (born 7 June 2000) is a British archer competing in compound events. She won the gold medal in the women's compound event at the 2022 European Indoor Archery Championships held in Laško, Slovenia. She also won the gold medal in the women's compound event at the 2022 World Games held in Birmingham, Alabama, United States.

Early life 

Gibson first tried archery in October 2014 and she joined an archery club in June 2015.

Career 

At the 2019 World Archery Youth Championships held in Madrid, Spain, she won the bronze medal in the women's junior compound team event. In November 2019, she set a new world record for the women's 60-arrow 18-metre indoor ranking round with a total of 596 out of 600 points at the GT Open held in Strassen, Luxembourg. The record stood for approximately three weeks as Sarah Prieels of Belgium set a new record of 597 out of 600 points in December 2019.

She won the silver medal in the women's compound event at the 2021 European Archery Championships held in Antalya, Turkey. In September 2021, she set a new world record for most points scored in women's 36-arrow 60-metre outdoor compound archery at the Battle of Britain 1440 event held in Burnham-on-Sea, Somerset, United Kingdom. In that same month, she also competed at the 2021 World Archery Championships held in Yankton, United States. She competed in the women's compound, women's team compound and compound mixed team events. In the women's compound competition she finished in second place in the ranking round and she was eliminated in the elimination round by Song Yun-soo of South Korea.

In January 2022, she finished in third place in the Women’s Open Pro event at the Lancaster Archery Classic held near Lancaster, Pennsylvania, United States. In February 2022, she won the gold medal in the women's compound event at the 2022 European Indoor Archery Championships held in Laško, Slovenia. She won the gold medal in the women's team compound event at the 2022 European Archery Championships held in Munich, Germany.

She has also won medals at several events of the Archery World Cup. She won three medals in the 2019 Archery World Cup and one medal in the 2021 Archery World Cup. She won the gold medal in the women's compound event at the Antalya, Turkey event in the 2022 Archery World Cup. She also won the gold medal in this event at the Paris, France event of the 2022 Archery World Cup. In Paris, France, she also won the silver medal in the women's team event and the bronze medal in the mixed team event.

She won the gold medal in the women's compound event at the 2022 World Games held in Birmingham, Alabama, United States. She defeated Sara López of Colombia in her gold medal match.

She won two medals at the 2022 Archery World Cup competition held in Medellín, Colombia: the gold medal in the women's individual event and the silver medal in the women's team event. A few months later, she won the silver medal in the final of the 2022 Archery World Cup held in Tlaxcala, Mexico.

References

External links
 

Living people
2000 births
Place of birth missing (living people)
British female archers
Competitors at the 2022 World Games
World Games gold medalists
World Games medalists in archery
21st-century British women